Vogtei may refer to:

the territory of a Vogt
Vogtei, Thuringia, a municipality in Thuringia, Germany
Vogtei (Verwaltungsgemeinschaft), a former local government unit in Thuringia, Germany